Miscellaneous Debris is an EP of five cover songs by Primus, released on March 12, 1992. The EP is the first release by the band to feature Les Claypool playing his now-famous fretless six-string Carl Thompson bass, nicknamed the "Rainbow Bass".

Reception

Critical reception

In his review for AllMusic, Stephen Thomas Erlewine describes the EP as "Primus' best release". He notes that the band "plays actual songs instead of sketching out a few ideas as an excuse for jamming", which means that "Miscellaneous Debris isn't as weird and alienating as previous albums", concluding that the band's covers "show flashes of brilliance, largely due to the loose yet focused musicianship."

Chart performance
Miscellaneous Debris peaked at number 69 on the Australian ARIA singles chart in May 1994. Although the EP never charted on the Billboard 200, its sole single "Making Plans for Nigel" peaked at number 30 on the Modern Rock Tracks chart February 15, 1992.

Track listing

Credits 
Writing, performance and production credits are adapted from the album liner notes.

Personnel

Primus 
 Les Claypool – six-string fretless bass, kazoo, vocals
 Larry "Ler" LaLonde – guitar
 Tim "Herb" Alexander – drums

Production 
 Primus – production
 Ron Rigler – engineering
 Matt Murman – engineering
 Peter Steinman – engineering
 Scott Skidmore – engineering
 John Golden – mastering

Visual art 
 "Snap" – sculpture
 Mary Scanlan – Photography
 Paul "Bosco" Haggard – photography

Studios 
 Coast Records, San Francisco, California – recording
 Different Fur, San Francisco, California – mixing
 The Plant, Sausalito, California – mixing
 K-Disc, Los Angeles, California – mastering

Charts

References

External links 
 

1992 debut EPs
Covers EPs
Primus (band) EPs